Jazzmin Leslie Ocampo McDonald (born December 17, 1997 in Las Piñas, Metro Manila, Philippines), known professionally as Jazz Ocampo, is a Filipina actress and commercial model. She was a contract artist of GMA Network.

Career
Ocampo's father is half-American while her mother is half-Spanish, which explains her mestiza looks. She started doing commercials at a very young age before she launched her acting career through TV5's Star Factor. She would later appear in several of TV5's television series while doing commercials for several companies like KFC, Master Oil Control with Zero Oil with James Reid, Pond's and Samsung.

In spite of her acting commitments, Ocampo still attends regular school and even brings her school assignments to work and reads in between tapings.

Filmography

Television

Movie

References

External links
TV5 official website

1997 births
Living people
Actresses from Metro Manila
Filipino child actresses
Filipino female models
Filipino people of American descent
Filipino people of Spanish descent
Filipino television actresses
GMA Network personalities
People from Las Piñas
Star Magic
TV5 (Philippine TV network) personalities